Kees de Korver (born 9 July 1951) is a Dutch rower. He competed in the men's coxed four event at the 1972 Summer Olympics.

References

1951 births
Living people
Dutch male rowers
Olympic rowers of the Netherlands
Rowers at the 1972 Summer Olympics
Place of birth missing (living people)